Alberto Delgado Airport  is an airport serving Trinidad, a city in the province of Sancti Spíritus in Cuba.

Facilities

See also
Casilda (Trinidad)
Valle de los Ingenios

References

External links

 
 

Airports in Cuba
Airport Alberto Delgado
Buildings and structures in Sancti Spíritus Province